David Wilson Barnes (born October 30, 1972) is an American actor. He has appeared in Capote (2005), The Company Men (2010), The Bourne Legacy (2012) and Bridge of Spies (2015). 

Barnes was born in San Diego, California. His other roles include the TV series Law & Order, 30 Rock, Sex and the City, A Gifted Man, The Good Wife and Blue Bloods.

Filmography

Film

Television

Video games

References

External links
 
 

1972 births
Living people
21st-century American male actors
People from San Diego
American male film actors